Alex DeMeo's Race America (also known in Europe as Corvette ZR-1 Challenge) is a racing video game for the Nintendo Entertainment System. The European version received the Chevrolet license to use its Corvette ZR-1 vehicles while those in the North American version had to be redesigned into vehicles that strongly resembled Dodge Vipers.

Gameplay
In the 2-player mode, the players race against each other using the same car model, but in different colors. In the single player mode, each player must compete against eight computer-controlled cars across the U.S. The drivers are all fictional and are not based on any racers of the era.

References

External links
 Play Race America (Java required)

Absolute Entertainment games
Imagineering (company) games
Milton Bradley Company video games
Multiplayer and single-player video games
Nintendo Entertainment System games
Nintendo Entertainment System-only games
Racing video games set in the United States
Video games developed in the United States
Video games scored by Mark Van Hecke
Video games set in 1990